(MSF; pronounced ), also known as Doctors Without Borders, is a charity that provides humanitarian medical care. It is a non-governmental organisation (NGO) of French origin known for its projects in conflict zones and in countries affected by endemic diseases. The organisation provides care for: diabetes, drug-resistant infections, HIV/AIDS, hepatitis C, tropical and neglected diseases, tuberculosis, vaccines and COVID-19. In 2019, the charity was active in 70 countries with over 35,000 personnel; mostly local doctors, nurses and other medical professionals, logistical experts, water and sanitation engineers, and administrators. Private donors provide about 90% of the organisation's funding, while corporate donations provide the rest, giving MSF an annual budget of approximately US$1.63 billion.

MSF was founded in 1971, in the aftermath of the Biafran famine of the Nigerian Civil War, by a small group of French doctors and journalists who sought to expand accessibility to medical care across national boundaries and irrespective of race, religion, creed or political affiliation. MSF's principles and operational guidelines are highlighted in its Charter, the Chantilly Principles, and the later La Mancha Agreement. Governance is addressed in Section 2 of the Rules portion of this final document. MSF has an associative, rather chaotic structure, where operational decisions are made, independently, by the five operational centres (Amsterdam, Barcelona-Athens, Brussels, Geneva and Paris). Common policies on core issues are coordinated by the International Council, in which each of the 24 sections (national offices) is represented. The International Council meets in Geneva, Switzerland, where the International Office, which coordinates international activities common to the operational centres, is based.

MSF has general consultative status with the United Nations Economic and Social Council. It received the 1999 Nobel Peace Prize in recognition of its members' continued efforts to provide medical care in acute crises, as well as raising international awareness of potential humanitarian disasters. James Orbinski, who was the president of the organisation at the time, accepted the prize on behalf of MSF. Prior to this, MSF also received the 1996 Seoul Peace Prize. Christos Christou succeeded Joanne Liu as international president in June 2019.

History

1967 to 1970 Biafra

During the Nigerian Civil War of 1967 to 1970, the Nigerian military formed a blockade around the nation's newly independent south-eastern region, Biafra. At this time, France was one of the few major countries supportive of the Biafrans (the United Kingdom, the Soviet Union and the United States sided with the Nigerian government), and the conditions within the blockade were unknown to the world. A number of French doctors volunteered with the French Red Cross to work in hospitals and feeding centers in besieged Biafra. One of the co-founders of the organisation was Bernard Kouchner, who later became a high-ranking French politician.

After entering the country, the volunteers, in addition to Biafran health workers and hospitals, were subjected to attacks by the Nigerian army, and witnessed civilians being murdered and starved by the blockading forces. The doctors publicly criticised the Nigerian government and the Red Cross for their seemingly complicit behaviour. These doctors concluded that a new aid organisation was needed that would ignore political/religious boundaries and prioritise the welfare of survivors.
Apart from Nigeria, MSF exists in several African countries including Benin, Zambia, Uganda, Kenya, South Africa, Rwanda, Sudan, Sierra Leone, etc.

1971 establishment
The  ("Emergency Medical and Surgical Intervention Group") was formed in 1971 by French doctors who had worked in Biafra, to provide aid and to emphasize the importance of survivors' rights. At the same time, Raymond Borel, the editor of the French medical journal TONUS, had started a group called  ("French Medical Relief") in response to the 1970 Bhola cyclone, which killed at least 625,000 in East Pakistan (now Bangladesh). Borel had intended to recruit doctors to provide aid to survivors of natural disasters. On 22 December 1971, the two groups of colleagues merged to form Médecins Sans Frontières.

MSF's first mission was to the Nicaraguan capital, Managua, where a 1972 earthquake had destroyed most of the city and killed between 10,000 and 30,000 people. The organisation, today known for its quick response in an emergency, arrived three days after the Red Cross had set up a relief mission. On 18 and 19 September 1974, Hurricane Fifi caused major flooding in Honduras and killed thousands of people (estimates vary), and MSF set up its first long-term medical relief mission.

Between 1975 and 1979, after South Vietnam had fallen to North Vietnam, millions of Cambodians immigrated to Thailand to avoid the Khmer Rouge. In response, MSF set up its first refugee camp missions in Thailand. When Vietnam withdrew from Cambodia in 1989, MSF started long-term relief missions to help survivors of the mass killings and reconstruct the country's health care system. Although its missions to Thailand to help victims of war in Southeast Asia could arguably be seen as its first wartime mission, MSF saw its first mission to a true war zone, including exposure to hostile fire, in 1976. MSF spent nine years (1976–1984) assisting surgeries in the hospitals of various cities in Lebanon, during the Lebanese Civil War, and established a reputation for its neutrality and willingness to work under fire. Throughout the war, MSF helped both Christian and Muslim soldiers alike, helping whichever group required the most medical aid at the time. In 1984, as the situation in Lebanon deteriorated further and security for aid groups was minimised, MSF withdrew its volunteers.

Original founders 

 Jacques Bérès
 Philippe Bernier
 Raymond Borel
 Jean Cabrol
 Marcel Delcourt
 Xavier Emmanuelli
 Pascal Grellety Bosviel
 Gérard Illiouz
 Bernard Kouchner
 Gérard Pigeon
 Vladan Radoman
 Max Récamier

1970s 
Claude Malhuret was elected as the new president of Médecins Sans Frontières in 1977, and soon after debates began over the future of the organisation. In particular, the concept of témoignage ("witnessing"), which refers to speaking out about the suffering that one sees as opposed to remaining silent, was being opposed or played down by Malhuret and his supporters. Malhuret thought MSF should avoid criticism of the governments of countries in which they were working, while Kouchner believed that documenting and broadcasting the suffering in a country was the most effective way to solve a problem.

In 1979, after four years of refugee movement from South Vietnam and the surrounding countries by foot and by boat, French intellectuals made an appeal in Le Monde for "A Boat for Vietnam", a project intended to provide medical aid to the refugees. Although the project did not receive support from the majority of MSF, some, including later Minister Bernard Kouchner, chartered a ship called L'Île de Lumière ("The Island of Light"), and, along with doctors, journalists and photographers, sailed to the South China Sea and provided some medical aid to the boat people. The splinter organisation that undertook this, Médecins du Monde, later developed the idea of humanitarian intervention as a duty, in particular on the part of Western nations such as France. In 2007 MSF clarified that for nearly 30 years MSF and Kouchner have had public disagreements on such issues as the right to intervene and the use of armed force for humanitarian reasons. Kouchner is in favour of the latter, whereas MSF stands up for an impartial humanitarian action, independent from all political, economic and religious powers.

1980s
In 1982, Malhuret and Rony Brauman (who became the organisation's president in 1982) brought increased financial independence to MSF by introducing fundraising-by-mail to better collect donations. The 1980s also saw the establishment of the other operational sections from MSF-France (1971): MSF-Belgium (1980), MSF-Switzerland (1981), MSF-Holland (1984), and MSF-Spain (1986). MSF-Luxembourg was the first support section, created in 1986. The early 1990s saw the establishment of the majority of the support sections: MSF-Greece (1990), MSF-USA (1990), MSF-Canada (1991), MSF-Japan (1992), MSF-UK (1993), MSF-Italy (1993), MSF-Australia (1994), as well as Germany, Austria, Denmark, Sweden, Norway, and Hong Kong (MSF-UAE was formed later). Malhuret and Brauman were instrumental in professionalising MSF. In December 1979, after the Soviet army had invaded Afghanistan, field missions were immediately set up to provide medical aid to the mujahideen, and in February 1980, MSF publicly denounced the Khmer Rouge. During the 1983–1985 famine in Ethiopia, MSF set up nutrition programmes in the country in 1984, but was expelled in 1985 after denouncing the abuse of international aid and the forced resettlements. MSF's explicit attacks on the Ethiopian government led to other NGOs criticizing their abandonment of their supposed neutrality and contributed to a series of debates in France around humanitarian ethics.  The group also set up equipment to produce clean drinking water for the population of San Salvador, capital of El Salvador, after 10 October 1986 earthquake that struck the city.

1990s
The early 1990s saw MSF open a number of new national sections, and at the same time, set up field missions in some of the most dangerous and distressing situations it had ever encountered.

In 1990, MSF first entered Liberia to help civilians and refugees affected by the Liberian Civil War. Constant fighting throughout the 1990s and the Second Liberian Civil War have kept MSF volunteers actively providing nutrition, basic health care, and mass vaccinations, and speaking out against attacks on hospitals and feeding stations, especially in Monrovia.

Field missions were set up to provide relief to Kurdish refugees who had survived the al-Anfal Campaign, for which evidence of atrocities was being collected in 1991. 1991 also saw the beginning of the civil war in Somalia, during which MSF set up field missions in 1992 alongside a UN peacekeeping mission. Although the UN-aborted operations by 1993, MSF representatives continued with their relief work, running clinics and hospitals for civilians.

MSF first began work in Srebrenica (in Bosnia and Herzegovina) as part of a UN convoy in 1993, one year after the Bosnian War had begun. The city had become surrounded by the Bosnian Serb Army and, containing about 60,000 Bosniaks, had become an enclave guarded by a United Nations Protection Force. MSF was the only organisation providing medical care to the surrounded civilians, and as such, did not denounce the genocide for fear of being expelled from the country (it did, however, denounce the lack of access for other organisations). MSF was forced to leave the area in 1995 when the Bosnian Serb Army captured the town. 40,000 Bosniak civilian inhabitants were deported, and approximately 7,000 were killed in mass executions.

1994 Rwandan Genocide
When the genocide in Rwanda began in April 1994, some delegates of MSF working in the country were incorporated into the International Committee of the Red Cross (ICRC) medical team for protection. Both groups succeeded in keeping all main hospitals in Rwanda's capital Kigali operational throughout the main period of the genocide. MSF, together with several other aid organisations, had to leave the country in 1995, although many MSF and ICRC volunteers worked together under the ICRC's rules of engagement, which held that neutrality was of the utmost importance. These events led to a debate within the organisation about the concept of balancing neutrality of humanitarian aid workers against their witnessing role. As a result of its Rwanda mission, the position of MSF with respect to neutrality moved closer to that of the ICRC, a remarkable development in the light of the origin of the organisation.

The ICRC lost 56 and MSF lost almost one hundred of their respective local staff in Rwanda, and MSF-France, which had chosen to evacuate its team from the country (the local staff were forced to stay), denounced the murders and demanded that a French military intervention stop the genocide. MSF-France introduced the slogan "One cannot stop a genocide with doctors" to the media, and the controversial Opération Turquoise followed less than one month later. This intervention directly or indirectly resulted in movements of hundreds of thousands of Rwandan refugees to Zaire and Tanzania in what became known as the Great Lakes refugee crisis, and subsequent cholera epidemics, starvation and more mass killings in the large groups of civilians. MSF-France returned to the area and provided medical aid to refugees in Goma.

At the time of the genocide, competition between the medical efforts of MSF, the ICRC, and other aid groups had reached an all-time high, but the conditions in Rwanda prompted a drastic change in the way humanitarian organisations approached aid missions. The Code of Conduct for the International Red Cross and Red Crescent Movement and NGOs in Disaster Relief Programmes was created by the ICRC in 1994 to provide a framework for humanitarian missions and MSF is a signatory of this code. The code advocates the provision of humanitarian aid only, and groups are urged not to serve any political or religious interest, or be used as a tool for foreign governments. MSF has since still found it necessary to condemn the actions of governments, such as in Chechnya in 1999, but has not demanded another military intervention since then.

2020s

2020 accusations of racism

More than a thousand staffers accused the charity of white supremacy when they voiced their concerns in a 2020 petition. One staffer from Cameroon detailed her experiences with racism from the group's leaders.  Many concerns involved different treatment of expatriate staff from Europe and North America, who are typically white, compared to national staff. In an interview with NPR, the president of the organisation acknowledged Doctors Without Borders was founded in racism and pledged to do better.

Response to political changes
MSF issued a statement for safe abortion following Dobbs v. Jackson Women's Health Organization.

Activities by location

In 1999, the organisation spoke out about the lack of humanitarian support in Kosovo and Chechnya, having set up field missions to help civilians affected by the respective political situations. Although MSF had worked in the Kosovo region since 1993, the onset of the Kosovo War prompted the movement of tens of thousands of refugees, and a decline in suitable living conditions. MSF provided shelter, water and health care to civilians affected by NATO's strategic bombing campaigns.

A serious crisis within MSF erupted in connection with the organisation's work in Kosovo when the Greek section of MSF was expelled from the organisation. The Greek MSF section had gained access to Serbia at the cost of accepting Serb government imposed limits on where it could go and what it could see – terms that the rest of the MSF movement had refused.  A non-MSF source alleged that the exclusion of the Greek section happened because its members extended aid to both Albanian and Serbian civilians in Pristina during NATO's bombing.
The rift was healed only in 2005 with the re-admission of the Greek section to MSF.

A similar situation was found in Chechnya, whose civilian population was largely forced from their homes into unhealthy conditions and subjected to the violence of the Second Chechen War.

MSF has been working in Haiti since 1991, but since President Jean-Bertrand Aristide was forced from power, the country has seen a large increase in civilian attacks and rape by armed groups. In addition to providing surgical and psychological support in existing hospitals – offering the only free surgery available in Port-au-Prince – field missions have been set up to rebuild water and waste management systems and treat survivors of major flooding caused by Hurricane Jeanne; patients with HIV/AIDS and malaria, both of which are widespread in the country, also receive better treatment and monitoring. As a result of 12 January 2010 Haiti earthquake, reports from Haiti indicated that all three of the organisation's hospitals had been severely damaged; one collapsing completely and the other two having to be abandoned. Following the quake, MSF sent about nine planes loaded with medical equipment and a field hospital to help treat the victims. However, the landings of some of the planes had to be delayed due to the massive number of humanitarian and military flights coming in.

The Kashmir Conflict in northern India resulted in a more recent MSF intervention (the first field mission was set up in 1999) to help civilians displaced by fighting in Jammu and Kashmir, as well as in Manipur. Psychological support is a major target of missions, but teams have also set up programmes to treat tuberculosis, HIV/AIDS and malaria. Mental health support has been of significant importance for MSF in much of southern Asia since the 2004 Indian Ocean earthquake.

MSF went through a long process of self-examination and discussion in 2005–2006. Many issues were debated, including the treatment of "nationals" as well as "fair employment" and self-criticism.

Sub-Saharan Africa

MSF has been active in a large number of African countries for decades, sometimes serving as the sole provider of health care, food, and water. Although MSF has consistently attempted to increase media coverage of the situation in Africa to increase international support, long-term field missions are still necessary. Treating and educating the public about HIV/AIDS in sub-Saharan Africa, which sees the most deaths and cases of the disease in the world, is a major task for volunteers. Of the 14.6 million people in need of anti-retroviral treatment the WHO estimated that only 5.25 million people were receiving it in developing countries, and MSF continues to urge governments and companies to increase research and development into HIV/AIDS treatments to decrease cost and increase availability.

(See AIDS in Africa for more information)

Sierra Leone
In the late 1990s, MSF missions were set up to treat tuberculosis and anaemia in residents of the Aral Sea area, and look after civilians affected by drug-resistant disease, famine, and epidemics of cholera and AIDS. They vaccinated 3 million Nigerians against meningitis during an epidemic in 1996 and denounced the Taliban's neglect of health care for women in 1997. Arguably, the most significant country in which MSF set up field missions in the late 1990s was Sierra Leone, which was involved in a civil war at the time. In 1998, volunteers began assisting in surgeries in Freetown to help with an increasing number of amputees, and collecting statistics on civilians (men, women and children) being attacked by large groups of men claiming to represent ECOMOG. The groups of men were travelling between villages and systematically chopping off one or both of each resident's arms, raping women, gunning down families, razing houses, and forcing survivors to leave the area. Long-term projects following the end of the civil war included psychological support and phantom limb pain management.

Sudan 
Since 1979, MSF has been providing medical humanitarian assistance in Sudan, a nation plagued by starvation and the civil war, prevalent malnutrition and one of the highest maternal mortality rates in the world. In March 2009, it is reported that MSF has employed 4,590 field staff in Sudan tackling issues such as armed conflicts, epidemic diseases, health care and social exclusion. MSF's continued presence and work in Sudan is one of the organisation's largest interventions. MSF provides a range of health care services including nutritional support, reproductive healthcare, Kala-Azar treatment, counselling services and surgery to the people living in Sudan. Common diseases prevalent in Sudan include tuberculosis, kala-azar also known as visceral leishmaniasis, meningitis, measles, cholera, and malaria.

Kala-Azar in Sudan
Kala-azar, also known as visceral leishmaniasis, has been one of the major health problems in Sudan. After the Comprehensive Peace Agreement between North and Southern Sudan on 9 January 2005, the increase in stability within the region helped further efforts in healthcare delivery. Médicins Sans Frontières tested a combination of sodium stibogluconate and paromomycin, which would reduce treatment duration (from 30 to 17 days) and cost in 2008. In March 2010, MSF set up its first Kala-Azar treatment centre in Eastern Sudan, providing free treatment for this otherwise deadly disease. If left untreated, there is a fatality rate of 99% within 1–4 months of infection. Since the treatment centre was set up, MSF has cured more than 27,000 Kala-Azar patients with a success rate of approximately 90–95%. There are plans to open an additional Kala-Azar treatment centre in Malakal, Southern Sudan, to cope with the overwhelming number of patients that are seeking treatment. MSF has been providing necessary medical supplies to hospitals and training Sudanese health professionals to help them deal with Kala-Azar. MSF, Sudanese Ministry of Health and other national and international institutions are combining efforts to improve on the treatment and diagnosis of Kala-Azar. Research on its cures and vaccines are currently being conducted. In December 2010, South Sudan was hit with the worst outbreak of Kala-Azar in eight years. The number of patients seeking treatment increased eight-fold as compared to the year before.

Health care infrastructure in Sudan
Sudan's latest civil war began in 1983 and ended in 2005 when a peace agreement was signed between North Sudan and South Sudan. MSF medical teams were active throughout and prior to the civil war, providing emergency medical humanitarian assistance in multiple locations. The situation of poor infrastructure in the South was aggravated by the civil war and resulted in the worsening of the region's appalling health indicators. An estimated 75 percent of people in the nascent nation has no access to basic medical care and 1 in seven women dies during childbirth. Malnutrition and disease outbreaks are perennial concerns as well. In 2011, MSF clinic in Jonglei State, South Sudan, was looted and attacked by raiders. Hundreds, including women and children were killed. Valuable items including medical equipment and drugs were lost during the raid and parts of the MSF facilities were destroyed in a fire. The incident had serious repercussions as MSF is the only primary health care provider in this part of Jonglei State.

Democratic Republic of the Congo
Although active in the Congo region of Africa since 1985, the First and Second Congo War brought increased violence and instability to the area. MSF has had to evacuate its teams from areas such as around Bunia, in the Ituri district due to extreme violence, but continues to work in other areas to provide food to tens of thousands of displaced civilians, as well as treat survivors of mass rapes and widespread fighting. The treatment and possible vaccination against diseases such as cholera, measles, polio, Marburg fever, sleeping sickness, HIV/AIDS, and bubonic plague is also important to prevent or slow down epidemics.

Uganda 
MSF has been active in Uganda since 1980, and provided relief to civilians during the country's guerrilla war during the Second Obote Period. However, the formation of the Lord's Resistance Army saw the beginning of a long campaign of violence in northern Uganda and southern Sudan. Civilians were subjected to mass killings and rapes, torture, and abductions of children, who would later serve as sex slaves or child soldiers. Faced with more than 1.5 million people displaced from their homes, MSF set up relief programmes in internally displaced person (IDP) camps to provide clean water, food and sanitation. Diseases such as tuberculosis, measles, polio, cholera, ebola, and HIV/AIDS occur in epidemics in the country, and volunteers provide vaccinations (in the cases of measles and polio) and/or treatment to the residents. Mental health is also an important aspect of medical treatment for MSF teams in Uganda since most people refuse to leave the IDP camps for constant fear of being attacked.

Ivory Coast 
MSF first camp set up a field mission in Côte d'Ivoire in 1990, but ongoing violence and the 2002 division of the country by rebel groups and the government led to several massacres, and MSF teams have even begun to suspect that an ethnic cleansing is occurring. Mass measles vaccinations, tuberculosis treatment and the re-opening of hospitals closed by fighting are projects run by MSF, which is the only group providing aid in much of the country.

MSF has strongly promoted the use of contraception in Africa.

West African Ebola outbreak 

During the Ebola outbreak in West Africa in 2014, MSF met serious medical demands largely on its own, after the organisation's early warnings were largely ignored.

Burundi 
MSF-Burundi has aided in attending to casualties suffered in the 2019 Burundi landslides.

Asia

Sri Lanka
MSF is involved in Sri Lanka, where a 26-year civil war ended in 2009 and MSF has adapted its activities there to continue its mission. For example, it helps with physical therapy for patients with spinal cord injuries. It conducts counseling sessions, and has set up an "operating theatre for reconstructive orthopaedic surgery and supplied specialist surgeons, anaesthetists and nurses to operate on patients with complicated war-related injuries".

Cambodia
MSF first provided medical help to civilians and refugees who have escaped to camps along the Thai-Cambodian border in 1979. Due to long decades of war, a proper health care system in the country was severely lacking and MSF moved inland in 1989 to help restructure basic medical facilities.

In 1999, Cambodia was hit with a malaria epidemic. The situation of the epidemic was aggravated by a lack of qualified practitioners and poor quality control which led to a market of fake antimalarial drugs. Counterfeit antimalarial drugs were responsible for the deaths of at least 30 people during the epidemic. This has prompted efforts by MSF to set up and fund a malaria outreach project and utilise Village Malaria Workers. MSF also introduced a switching of first-line treatment to a combination therapy (Artesunate and Mefloquine) to combat resistance and fatality of old drugs that were used to treat the disease traditionally.

Cambodia is one of the hardest hit HIV/AIDS countries in Southeast Asia. In 2001, MSF started introducing antiretroviral (ARV) therapy to AIDS patients for free. This therapy prolongs the patients' lives and is a long-term treatment. In 2002, MSF established chronic diseases clinics with the Cambodian Ministry of Health in various provinces to integrate HIV/AIDS treatment, alongside hypertension, diabetes, and arthritis which have high prevalence rate. This aims to reduce facility-related stigma as patients are able to seek treatment in a multi-purpose clinic in contrast to a HIV/AIDS specialised treatment centre.

MSF also provided humanitarian aid in times of natural disaster such as a major flood in 2002 which affected up to 1.47 million people. MSF introduced a community-based tuberculosis programme in 2004 in remote villages, where village volunteers are delegated to facilitate the medication of patients. In partnership with local health authorities and other NGOs, MSF encouraged decentralized clinics and rendered localized treatments to more rural areas from 2006. Since 2007, MSF has extended general health care, counselling, HIV/AIDS and TB treatment to prisons in Phnom Penh via mobile clinics. However, poor sanitation and lack of health care still prevails in most Cambodian prisons as they remain as some of the world's most crowded prisons.

In 2007, MSF worked with the Cambodian Ministry of Health to provide psychosocial and technical support in offering pediatric HIV/AIDS treatment to affected children. MSF also provided medical supplies and staff to help in one of the worst dengue outbreaks in 2007, which had more than 40,000 people hospitalized, killing 407 people, primarily children.

In 2010, Southern and Eastern provinces of Cambodia were hit with a cholera epidemic and MSF responded by providing medical support that were adapted for usage in the country.

Cambodia is one of 22 countries listed by WHO as having a high burden of tuberculosis. WHO estimates that 64% of all Cambodians carry the tuberculosis mycobacterium. Hence, MSF has since shifted its focus away from HIV/AIDS to tuberculosis, handing over most HIV-related programs to local health authorities.

Middle East and North Africa

Libya
The 2011 Libyan civil war has prompted efforts by MSF to set up a hospital and mental health services to help locals affected by the conflict. The fighting created a backlog of patients that needed surgery. With parts of the country slowly returning to livable, MSF has started working with local health personnel to address the needs. The need for psychological counseling has increased and MSF has set up mental health services to address the fears and stress of people living in tents without water and electricity. Currently MSF is the only International Aid organisation with actual presence in the country.

Search and Rescue in the Mediterranean Sea
MSF is providing Maritime Search And Rescue (SAR) services on the Mediterranean Sea to save the lives of migrants attempting to cross with unseaworthy boats. The Mission started in 2015 after the EU ended its major SAR operation Mare Nostrum severely diminishing much needed SAR capacities in the Mediterranean. Throughout the mission MSF has operated its own vessels like the Bourbon Argos (2015–2016), Dignity 1 (2015–2016) and VOS Prudence (2016–2017). MSF has also provided medical teams to support other NGOs and their ships like the MOAS Phoenix (2015) or the Aquarius (2017–2018) and Ocean Viking (2019–2020) with SOS Méditerranée and Mediterranea Saving Humans. In August 2017 MSF decided to suspend the activities of the VOS Prudence protesting restrictions and threats by the Libyan "Coast Guard".

In December 2018 MSF and SOS Méditerranée were forced to end operations of the Aquarius, at that date the last remaining vessel supported by MSF. This came after attacks by EU states that stripped the vessel of its registration and produced criminal accusations against MSF. Up to then 80,000 people had been rescued or assisted since the beginning of the mission. Operations resumed with Ocean Viking in July 2019, but the ship was seized in Sicily in July 2020. In May 2021, MSF returned to refugee rescue operations in the Mediterranean with a new vessel, the Geo Barents. Within a month this resulted in the rescue of some 400 people.

Yemen
MSF is involved in trying to help with the humanitarian crisis caused by the Yemeni Civil War. The organisation operates eleven hospitals and health centres in Yemen and provides support to another 18 hospitals or health centres. According to MSF, since October 2015, four of its hospitals and one ambulance have been destroyed by Saudi-led coalition airstrikes. In August 2016, an airstrike on Abs hospital killed 19 people, including one MSF staff member, and wounded 24. According to MSF, the GPS coordinates of the hospital were repeatedly shared with all parties to the conflict, including the Saudi-led coalition, and its location was well-known.

Europe

The Netherlands
In August and September 2022, MSF provided medical care to asylum seekers staying outside the overcrowded migration centre in Ter Apel, the Netherlands.

Organisation of activities
Before a field mission is established in a country, an MSF team visits the area to determine the nature of the humanitarian emergency, the level of safety in the area and what type of aid is needed (this is called an "exploratory mission").

Medical aid is the main objective of most missions, although some missions help in such areas as water purification and nutrition.

Field mission team

A field mission team usually consists of a small number of coordinators to head each component of a field mission, and a "head of mission". The head of mission usually has the most experience in humanitarian situations of the members of the team, and it is their job to deal with the media, national governments and other humanitarian organisations. The head of mission does not necessarily have a medical background.

Medical volunteers include physicians, surgeons, nurses, and various other specialists. In addition to operating the medical and nutrition components of the field mission, these volunteers are sometimes in charge of a group of local medical staff and provide training for them.

Although the medical volunteers almost always receive the most media attention when the world becomes aware of an MSF field mission, there are a number of non-medical volunteers who help keep the field mission functioning. Logisticians are responsible for providing everything that the medical component of a mission needs, ranging from security and vehicle maintenance to food and electricity supplies. They may be engineers and/or foremen, but they usually also help with setting up treatment centres and supervising local staff. Other non-medical staff are water/sanitation specialists, who are usually experienced engineers in the fields of water treatment and management and financial/administration/human resources experts who are placed with field missions.

Medical component

Vaccination campaigns are a major part of the medical care provided during MSF missions. Diseases such as diphtheria, measles, meningitis, tetanus, pertussis, yellow fever, polio, and cholera, all of which are uncommon in developed countries, may be prevented with vaccination. Some of these diseases, such as cholera and measles, spread rapidly in large populations living in close proximity, such as in a refugee camp, and people must be immunised by the hundreds or thousands in a short period of time. For example, in Beira, Mozambique, in 2004, an experimental cholera vaccine was received twice by approximately 50,000 residents in about one month.

An equally important part of the medical care provided during MSF missions is AIDS treatment (with antiretroviral drugs), AIDS testing, and education. MSF is the only source of treatment for many countries in Africa, whose citizens make up the majority of people with HIV and AIDS worldwide. Because antiretroviral drugs (ARVs) are not readily available, MSF usually provides treatment for opportunistic infections and educates the public on how to slow transmission of the disease.

In most countries, MSF increases the capabilities of local hospitals by improving sanitation, providing equipment and drugs, and training local hospital staff. When the local staff is overwhelmed, MSF may open new specialised clinics for treatment of an endemic disease or surgery for victims of war. International staff start these clinics but MSF strives to increase the local staff's ability to run the clinics themselves through training and supervision. In some countries, like Nicaragua, MSF provides public education to increase awareness of reproductive health care and venereal disease.

Since most of the areas that require field missions have been affected by a natural disaster, civil war, or endemic disease, the residents usually require psychological support as well. Although the presence of an MSF medical team may decrease stress somewhat among survivors, often a team of psychologists or psychiatrists help people who have depression, survivors of domestic violence and those with substance use disorder. The doctors may also train local mental health staff. Such cases include Palestinian refugee camps, where long-term displacement and geopolitical circumstances have left many residents without long-term purpose or clear strategies for action. Humanitarian actors, like Médecins Sans Frontières, have sometimes responded by proferring coping skills to residents as a humanitarian aim and outcome. In the late 2000s, Médecins Sans Frontières launched a mental health program in Burj al Barajneh camp in Lebanon, providing sexual and reproductive health services, mental health support, and health promotion activities.

Nutrition
Often in situations where an MSF mission is set up, there is moderate or severe malnutrition as a result of war, drought, or government economic mismanagement. Intentional starvation is also sometimes used during a war as a weapon, and MSF, in addition to providing food, brings awareness to the situation and insists on foreign government intervention. Infectious diseases and diarrhoea, both of which cause weight loss and weakening of a person's body (especially in children), must be treated with medication and proper nutrition to prevent further infections and weight loss. A combination of the above situations, as when a civil war is fought during times of drought and infectious disease outbreaks, can create famine.

In emergency situations where there is a lack of nutritious food, but not to the level of a true famine, protein-energy malnutrition is most common among young children. Marasmus, a form of calorie deficiency, is the most common form of childhood malnutrition and is characterised by severe wasting and often fatal weakening of the immune system. Kwashiorkor, a form of calorie and protein deficiency, is a more serious type of malnutrition in young children, and can negatively affect physical and mental development. Both types of malnutrition can make opportunistic infections fatal. In these situations, MSF sets up Therapeutic Feeding Centres for monitoring the children and any other malnourished individuals.

A Therapeutic Feeding Centre (or Therapeutic Feeding Programme) is designed to treat severe malnutrition through the gradual introduction of a special diet intended to promote weight gain after the individual has been treated for other health problems. The treatment programme is split between two phases:
 Phase 1 lasts for 24 hours and involves basic health care and several small meals of low energy/protein food spaced over the day.
 Phase 2 involves monitoring of the patient and several small meals of high energy/protein food spaced over each day until the individual's weight approaches normal.

MSF uses foods designed specifically for treatment of severe malnutrition. During phase 1, a type of therapeutic milk called F-75 is fed to patients. F-75 is a relatively low energy, low fat/protein milk powder that must be mixed with water and given to patients to prepare their bodies for phase 2. During phase 2, therapeutic milk called F-100, which is higher in energy/fat/protein content than F-75, is given to patients, usually along with a peanut butter mixture called Plumpy'nut. F-100 and Plumpy'nut are designed to quickly provide large amounts of nutrients so that patients can be treated efficiently. Other special food fed to populations in danger of starvation includes enriched flour and porridge, as well as a high protein biscuit called BP5. BP5 is a popular food for treating populations because it can be distributed easily and sent home with individuals, or it can be crushed and mixed with therapeutic milk for specific treatments.

Dehydration, sometimes due to diarrhoea or cholera, may also be present in a population, and MSF set up rehydration centres to combat this. A special solution called Oral Rehydration Solution (ORS), which contains glucose and electrolytes, is given to patients to replace fluids lost. Antibiotics are also sometimes given to individuals with diarrhoea if it is known that they have cholera or dysentery.

Water and sanitation
Clean water is essential for hygiene, for consumption and for feeding programmes (for mixing with powdered therapeutic milk or porridge), as well as for preventing the spread of water-borne disease. As such, MSF water engineers and volunteers must create a source of clean water. This is usually achieved by modifying an existing water well, by digging a new well and/or starting a water treatment project to obtain clean water for a population. Water treatment in these situations may consist of storage sedimentation, filtration and/or chlorination depending on available resources.

Sanitation is an essential part of field missions, and it may include education of local medical staff in proper sterilisation techniques, sewage treatment projects, proper waste disposal, and education of the population in personal hygiene. Proper wastewater treatment and water sanitation are the best way to prevent the spread of serious water-borne diseases, such as cholera. Simple wastewater treatment systems can be set up by volunteers to protect drinking water from contamination. Garbage disposal could include pits for normal waste and incineration for medical waste. However, the most important subject in sanitation is the education of the local population, so that proper waste and water treatment can continue once MSF has left the area.

Statistics
In order to accurately report the conditions of a humanitarian emergency to the rest of the world and to governing bodies, data on a number of factors are collected during each field mission. The rate of malnutrition in children is used to determine the malnutrition rate in the population, and then to determine the need for feeding centres. Various types of mortality rates are used to report the seriousness of a humanitarian emergency, and a common method used to measure mortality in a population is to have staff constantly monitoring the number of burials at cemeteries. By compiling data on the frequency of diseases in hospitals, MSF can track the occurrence and location of epidemic increases (or "seasons") and stockpile vaccines and other drugs. For example, the "Meningitis Belt" (sub-Saharan Africa, which sees the most cases of meningitis in the world) has been "mapped" and the meningitis season occurs between December and June. Shifts in the location of the Belt and the timing of the season can be predicted using cumulative data over many years.

In addition to epidemiological surveys, MSF also uses population surveys to determine the rates of violence in various regions. By estimating the scopes of massacres, and determining the rate of kidnappings, rapes, and killings, psychosocial programmes can be implemented to lower the suicide rate and increase the sense of security in a population. Large-scale forced migrations, excessive civilian casualties and massacres can be quantified using surveys, and MSF can use the results to put pressure on governments to provide help, or even expose genocide. MSF conducted the first comprehensive mortality survey in Darfur in 2004.
However, there may be ethical problems in collecting these statistics.

Innovation and use of Technology 
In 2014 MSF partnered with satellite operator SES, other NGOs Archemed, Fondation Follereau, Friendship Luxembourg and German Doctors, and the Luxembourg government in the pilot phase of SATMED, a project to use satellite broadband technology to bring eHealth and telemedicine to isolated areas of developing countries. SATMED was first deployed in Sierra Leone in support of the fight against Ebola.

Governance and structure 
List of international presidents:

 1991–1992 Rony Brauman
 1992 Reginald Moreels
 1992–1994 Rony Brauman
 1994–1995 Jacques De Milliano
 1995–1996 Doris Schopper
 1996–1997 Philippe Biberson
 1997–1998 Doris Schopper
 1998–2000 James Orbinski 
 2000–2003 Morten Rostrup
 2004–2006 Rowan Gillies
 2006–2010 Christophe Fournier
 2010–2013 Unni Karunakara
 2013–2019 Joanne Liu
 2019–Present Christos Christou 
In addition to the Geneva global headquarters and five regional operational centers, as of 2020 MSF had national offices as follows:

 MSF Australia 
 MSF Austria
 MSF Belgium
 MSF Brazil 
 MSF Canada 
 MSF Czech Republic
 MSF Denmark 
 MSF Eastern Africa
 MSF Finland
 MSF France 
 MSF Germany
 MSF Greece 
 MSF Hong Kong 
 MSF Ireland
 MSF Italy
 MSF Japan
 MSF Republic of Korea 
 MSF Lat (Spanish Speaking South America)
 MSF Luxembourg 
 MSF Mexico
 MSF Netherlands
 MSF Norway
 MSF South Africa 
 MSF SARA (South Asia Regional Association: India, Pakistan, Afghanistan, Sri Lanka, Bangladesh)
 MSF Spain 
 MSF Sweden 
 MSF Switzerland 
 MSF Taiwan 
 MSF United Kingdom 
 MSF United States

In-house organisations

Epicentre

In 1986, MSF created Epicentre, an in-house research organisation, to support its activities. Epicentre conducts training, publishes scientific papers and develops new techniques for MSF. It performs epidemiological research, conducts clinical vaccine trials during outbreaks MSF is responding to, experiments on vaccine stability, and analysis of vaccine deployment strategy.

Campaign for Access to Essential Medicines

The Campaign for Access to Essential Medicines was initiated in 1999 to increase access to essential medicines in developing countries. "Essential medicines" are those drugs that are needed in sufficient supply to treat a disease common to a population. However, most diseases common to populations in developing countries are no longer common to populations in developed countries; therefore, pharmaceutical companies find that producing these drugs is no longer profitable and may raise the price per treatment, decrease development of the drug (and new treatments) or even stop production of the drug. MSF often lacks effective drugs during field missions, and started the campaign to put pressure on governments and pharmaceutical companies to increase funding for essential medicines.

In 2006, MSF tried to use its influence to urge the drug maker Novartis to drop its case against India's patent law that prevents Novartis from patenting its drugs in India. A few years earlier, Novartis also sued South Africa to prevent it from importing cheaper AIDS drugs. On 1 April 2013, it was announced that the Indian court invalidated Novartis's patent on imatinib (Gleevec). This decision makes the drug available via generics on the Indian market at a considerably lower price.

In March 2017, Els Torreele who had been leading the campaign from 1999 to 2003 returned to MSF as the executive director of the Access Campaign. For the following three years she led a global analysis and advocacy team whose goal was to guarantee that appropriate medicines, vaccines and diagnostics are developed, available, affordable and adapted to people's needs.

As of 2022, the most critical subjects of the campaign were rising antimicrobial resistance and outbreaks of epidemic diseases such as Ebola and COVID. Still, a lot of vaccines, diagnostics and medicines were inaccessible for people in need.

Security risks to staff
MSF staff are sometimes attacked or kidnapped. In some countries, humanitarian-aid organisations are viewed as helping the enemy. If an aid mission is perceived to be exclusively set up for victims on one side of the conflict, it may come under attack. However, the War on Terrorism has generated attitudes among some groups in US-occupied countries that non-governmental aid organisations such as MSF are allied with or even work for the Coalition forces. Insecurity in cities in Afghanistan and Iraq rose significantly following United States operations, and MSF has declared that providing aid in these countries was too dangerous. The organisation was forced to evacuate its teams from Afghanistan on 28 July 2004, after five staff (Afghans Fasil Ahmad and Besmillah, Belgian Hélène de Beir, Norwegian Egil Tynæs, and Dutchman Willem Kwint) were killed on 2 June in an ambush by unidentified militia near Khair Khāna in Badghis Province. In June 2007, Elsa Serfass, a staff member with MSF-France, was killed in the Central African Republic and in January 2008, two expatriate staff (Damien Lehalle and Victor Okumu) and a national staff member (Mohammed Bidhaan Ali) were killed in an organised attack in Somalia resulting in the closing of the project.

Arrests and abductions in politically unstable regions can also occur for volunteers, and in some cases, MSF field missions can be expelled entirely from a country. Arjan Erkel, Head of Mission in Dagestan in the North Caucasus, was kidnapped and held hostage in an unknown location by unknown abductors from 12 August 2002 until 11 April 2004. Paul Foreman, head of MSF-Holland, was arrested in Sudan in May 2005 for refusing to divulge documents used in compiling a report on rapes carried out by the pro-government Janjaweed militias (see Darfur conflict). Foreman cited the privacy of the women involved, and MSF alleged that the Sudanese government had arrested him because it disliked the bad publicity generated by the report.

On 14 August 2013, MSF announced that it was closing all of its programmes in Somalia due to attacks on its staff by Al-Shabaab militants and perceived indifference or inurement to this by the governmental authorities and wider society.

On 3 October 2015, 14 staff and 28 others died when an MSF hospital was bombed by American forces during the Battle of Kunduz.  On 7 October 2015, US President Barack Obama issued an apology. Doctors Without Borders was not satisfied by Obama's apology.

On 27 October 2015, an MSF hospital in Sa'dah, Yemen, was bombed by the Saudi Arabia-led military coalition.

On 28 November 2015, an MSF-supported hospital was barrel-bombed by a Syrian Air Force helicopter, killing seven and wounding forty-seven people near Homs, Syria.

On 10 January 2016, an MSF-supported hospital in Sa'dah was bombed by the Saudi Arabia-led military coalition, killing six people.

On 15 February 2016, two MSF-supported hospitals in Idlib District and Aleppo, Syria, were bombed, killing at least 20 and injuring dozens of patients and medical personnel. Both Russia and the United States denied responsibility and being in the area at the time.

On 28 April 2016, an MSF hospital in Aleppo was bombed, killing 50, including six staff and patients.

On 12 May 2020, an MSF-supported hospital in Dasht-e-Barchi, Kabul, Afghanistan, was attacked by an unknown assailant. The attack left 24 people dead and at least 20 more injured.

On 25 June 2021 three MSF employees were reported killed in Tigray, Ethiopia.

Awards

1999 Nobel Peace Prize

The then president of MSF, James Orbinski, gave the Nobel Peace Prize speech on behalf of the organisation. In the opening, he discusses the conditions of the victims of the Rwandan genocide and focuses on one of his woman patients:

Orbinski affirmed the organisation's commitment to publicizing the issues MSF encountered, stating

Lasker Prize
MSF received the Lasker-Bloomberg Public Service Award in 2015 from the New York based Lasker Foundation.

Namesakes

The French game show Jeux Sans Frontières ("Games Without Frontiers") is older, being first broadcast in Europe in 1965.

A number of other unrelated non-governmental organisations have adopted names ending in "Sans Frontières" or "Without Borders", inspired by Médecins Sans Frontières: for example, Engineers Without Borders, Avocats Sans Frontières (Lawyers Without Borders), Reporters sans frontières (Reporters Without Borders), Payasos Sin Fronteras (Clowns Without Borders), Bibliothèques Sans Frontières, and Homeopaths Without Borders.

Controversies

There have been several significant scandals including sexual misconduct, racism, exploitation and other similar cases, including exploitation of patients in their care, including children and staff. 

One scandal involves exploitative images taken and sold without consent of patients. Images include a mourning mother standing over her dead baby boy, child rape survivors and sexual and domestic abuse survivors.

MSF's funding model has come under scrutiny after BlackRock donated $500,000 towards its COVID-19 crisis fund, leading to calls of hypocrisy from staff and other humanitarian organisations.

See also

Non-fiction work about MSF 

 Hope in Hell, 2006 book by Dan Bortolotti
 Living in Emergency, 2008 documentary film by Mark N. Hopkins that tells the story of four MSF volunteer doctors confronting the challenges of medical work in war-torn areas of Liberia and Congo
 An Imperfect Offering, 2008 memoir by former MSF president James Orbinski
 Triage: Dr. James Orbinski's Humanitarian Dilemma 2007 documentary
 Six Months in Sudan, 2009 memoir by doctor James Maskalyk
 The Photographer: Into War-torn Afghanistan with Doctors Without Borders, graphic novel

Relevant topics 
 Attacks on humanitarian workers

References

Further reading

External links

 

 
International volunteer organizations
Organizations awarded Nobel Peace Prizes
Organisations based in Geneva
Organizations established in 1971
Recipients of the Four Freedoms Award
1971 establishments in France
Medical volunteerism
Swiss Nobel laureates
Articles containing video clips
Humanitarian aid organizations
Humanitarian aid
Humanitarian aid organizations in Europe
Non-governmental organizations
Medical and health organisations based in Switzerland
Nansen Refugee Award laureates